The Lightbox is a public gallery and museum located in Woking, Surrey, in the South East of England. Three galleries host a range of exhibitions, changing regularly and it has a free museum of local history - 'Woking's Story'. It was opened on 14 September 2007.

Overview 
Located in the centre of Woking on the banks of the Basingstoke Canal, The Lightbox was built to provide arts and heritage services to the local region and beyond. The project began in 1993 when a group of local volunteers decided to try and establish a cultural centre in the Woking area. Following a fundraising campaign the contemporary building was designed by Marks Barfield Architects, the architects behind the London Eye.

In 2008 it won the Art Fund Prize Museum of the Year award, and in 2016 it was awarded a Green Tourism silver award. The Lightbox holds charitable status and is part-funded by Woking Borough Council, and it has received support from the Heritage Lottery Fund and the Arts Council.

The Lightbox hosts around 20 temporary exhibitions per year, the majority of which are devised in-house.

Admission 

General Admission Free: This includes the Café, the Shop, the Art Fund Prize Gallery and Woking's Story museum. Entrance to Main and Upper Gallery exhibitions only with a £9.50 Day Pass (with the option of an additional £1 donation to The Lightbox charity programme). Lightbox Members and under 21s visit free.

Lightbox Membership comes in four tiers: Individual Members pay £30 per annum, Individual Plus Members pay £40 per annum, Joint Members pay £50 per annum and Joint Plus Members pay £60 per annum.

Exhibitions 
Past exhibitions at The Lightbox have included collections of work by Elisabeth Frink, Gertrude Jekyll, Auguste Renoir, Damien Hirst, Andy Warhol, and John Constable.

References

External links
 Official website

Museums in Surrey
Museums established in 2007
2007 establishments in England
Woking
Art museums and galleries in Surrey